Wattamolla, also known as Wattamolla Beach, is a cove, lagoon, and beach on the New South Wales coast south of Sydney, within the Royal National Park.

History
Wattamolla is the local Aboriginal name of the area, meaning "place near running water". That name was recorded as Watta-Mowlee by Matthew Flinders, but is today spelt Wattamolla.

Matthew Flinders, George Bass and a boy, William Martin had been exploring the south-coast from Port Jackson as far as Lake Illawarra, in a small boat named Tom Thumb. Returning on the evening of 29 March 1796, a southerly gale forced them to seek shelter.

Flinders, "steering with an oar", thought the dark outline of cliffs ended and believed he saw breakers, so he turned the boat towards shore. Catching a large wave, they "shot across a sandbar" and in moments were in the calm sheltered water of the lagoon, which in relief they named Providential Cove.

On 15 May 1797, three members of the crew of the Sydney Cove were spotted by a fisherman on Wattamolla Beach, having trekked from the Ninety Mile Beach Victoria on route to Sydney, to seek help rescuing their crew.

The Headland Perversely recorded as "Providential Head" was renamed "Martin Head"- And "Martin Point" was then renamed "Providential Point".

Gallery

See also
Sydney Cove (1796 ship)

References

External links 
Historical images of Wattamolla on Trove

External links 
Wattamolla Beach Guide

Bays of New South Wales
Beaches of New South Wales
Lagoons of Australia
Sutherland Shire